The 1997 Dutch Open was an ATP men's tennis tournament held in Amsterdam, Netherlands that was part of the World Series category of the 1997 ATP Tour. It was the 38th edition of the tournament and was held from 28 July to 3 August. Unseeded Ctislav Doseděl won his first title of the year, and the third of his career.

Finals

Singles

 Ctislav Doseděl defeated  Carlos Moyá 7–6(7–4), 7–6(7–5), 6–7(4–7), 6–2

Doubles

 Paul Kilderry /  Nicolás Lapentti defeated  Andrew Kratzmann /  Libor Pimek 3–6, 7–5, 7–6

References

 
Dutch Open (tennis)
Dutch Open
Dutch Open (tennis), 1997